A double referendum was held in Switzerland on 15 May 1927. Voters were asked whether they approved of amending article 30 of the constitution and a federal law on car and bicycle traffic. The constitutional amendment was approved by voters, whilst the traffic law was rejected.

Background
The constitutional question was a mandatory referendum, which required a double majority; a majority of the popular vote and majority of the cantons. The decision of each canton was based on the vote in that canton. Full cantons counted as one vote, whilst half cantons counted as half. The traffic law question was an optional referendum, and required only a majority of voters.

Results

Constitutional amendment

Traffic law

References

1927 referendums
1927 in Switzerland
Referendums in Switzerland